GNTI may refer to:

 5'-Guanidinonaltrindole
 6'-Guanidinonaltrindole
 A-1,3-mannosyl-glycoprotein 2-b-N-acetylglucosaminyltransferase, an enzyme